"Love Is Stronger Than Pride" may refer to:
"Love Is Stronger Than Pride" (Sade song)
"Love Is Stronger Than Pride" (Ricochet song)